Lady Tsukiyama or  (d. 9 September 1579) was a Japanese noble lady and aristocrat from the Sengoku period. She was the chief consort of Tokugawa Ieyasu, the daimyō who would become the founder and first shōgun of the Tokugawa shogunate. She was the mother of Ieyasu's first child, Kamehime, and gave birth to Ieyasu's heir apparent, Matsudaira Nobuyasu. As principal consort, Tsukiyama led many of the political achievements of the former Matsudaira clan. She was an important figure at the beginning of Ieyasu's career, who later led to the beginning of Tokugawa Shogunate. She is best known for possibly initiating a conspiracy against Oda Nobunaga. Whether or not she cheated Ieyasu into joining the Takeda clan; the veracity of this event remains one of the greatest mysteries of the Sengoku period, known as the Nobuyasu Incident.

Life
Lady Tsukiyama was the daughter of Sekiguchi Chikanaga, an Imagawa retainer. Her mother was Imagawa Yoshimoto's former concubine and daughter of Ii Naohira. Lady Tsukiyama was also known as  before she married Tokugawa Ieyasu. Sena was related to Ii Naotora who was the female lord of Ii clan. Sena's actions were vital for the Ii clan to ally with Ieyasu. The Ii family members became one of the most important retainers of the Tokugawa shogunate.

In January 1557, Lady Tsukiyama married Tokugawa Ieyasu. The marriage was arranged by Imagawa Yoshimoto, ostensibly to help cement ties between the Imagawa clan and the Tokugawa clan. Two years later, on 13 March 1559, she gave birth to Ieyasu's eldest son, Matsudaira Nobuyasu. In 1560, she gave birth to a daughter, Kamehime.

When Ieyasu moved to Hamamatsu in 1570, he left Lady Tsukiyama and their eldest son at Okazaki Castle. During this time, he had started an affair with Lady Saigō. In 1573, one of Tsukiyama's maid servants, Oman, became pregnant by Ieyasu. Oman bore him a son, Hideyasu, though Ieyasu was slow to claim lest it anger his wife.

Because Nobuyasu had no sons by his wife Tokuhime, a daughter of Oda Nobunaga, Lady Tsukiyama decided to procure a daughter of a Takeda retainer for her son's concubine. Seeing this and all of the conflicts that her mother-in-law made against her, Tokuhime sent a letter to her father, telling him that Lady Tsukiyama was conspiring with the Takeda clan against the Oda clan. Oda Nobunaga informed Ieyasu of this letter, and as a show of good faith and loyalty, and to preserve the Oda-Tokugawa alliance, Ieyasu ordered his wife executed, and Nobuyasu imprisoned due to his closeness with his mother.

On 9 September 1579, Lady Tsukiyama was beheaded on the shore of Lake Sanaru, in Hamamatsu. Her primary grave is at Seiryū temple (清流寺) in Tenryu ward, Hamamatsu. Her head was sent to Okazaki and interred at Yūden temple (祐傳寺); during the Tenpō era (1830–1844) it was transferred to Hachioji Shrine (八王子神社).

Knowing his eldest son would feel obligated to avenge his late mother's death, Ieyasu eventually ordered Nobuyasu, who was confined at Futamata Castle (now Tenryū Ward, Hamamatsu), to commit suicide (seppuku) on 5 October 1579. His Buddhist name is Shoge-in.

Popular culture 
 Nanao portrayed her in the 2017 NHK Taiga drama Naotora: The Lady Warlord (おんな城主 直虎).
 Lady Tsukiyama appears as a playable character in the 2021 Koei Tecmo game Samurai Warriors 5.
 Kasumi Arimura portrays her (from youth to adulthood) in the 2023 NHK Taiga drama What Will You Do, Ieyasu?, opposite Jun Matsumoto as Takechiyo/Ieyasu.

References

1579 deaths
16th-century Japanese women
Ii clan
Imagawa clan
People of Sengoku-period Japan
Tokugawa clan
Year of birth unknown